Kresse is a surname. Notable people with the surname include:

 Bill Kresse (1933–2014), American cartoonist
 Hans G. Kresse (1921–1992), Dutch cartoonist
 John Kresse (born 1943), American basketball coach
 Kurt Kresse (1904–1945), German communist and resistance fighter